The 1950–51 season was Arsenal's 32nd consecutive season in the top division of English football.

Results
Arsenal's score comes first

Legend

Football League First Division

Final League table

FA Cup

Arsenal entered the FA Cup in the third round, in which they were drawn to face Carlisle United.

Squad statistics
Numbers in parentheses denote appearances as substitute.
Players with names in italics and marked * were on loan from another club for the whole of their season with Arsenal.

Source:

See also

 1950–51 in English football
 List of Arsenal F.C. seasons

References

English football clubs 1950–51 season
1950-51